The Combination Act 1799 (39 Geo. III, c. 81) titled An Act to prevent Unlawful Combinations of Workmen, prohibited trade unions and collective bargaining by British workers. The Act received royal assent on 12 July 1799. An additional Act, the Combination Act 1800, was passed in 1800 (39 & 40 Geo III c. 106).

Background
The 1799 and 1800 acts were passed under the government of William Pitt the Younger as a response to Jacobin activity and the fear of then-Home Secretary the Duke of Portland that workers would strike during a conflict to force the government to accede to their demands. Collectively these acts were known as the Combination Acts. Under these laws any combination of two or more masters, or two or more workmen, to lower or raise wages, or to increase of diminish the number of hours of work, or quantity of work to be done, was punishable at common law as a misdemeanor.

Significance
The legislation drove labour organisations underground. Sympathy for the plight of the workers brought repeal of the acts in 1824. Lobbying by the radical tailor Francis Place played a role in this. However, in response to the series of strikes that followed, the Combinations of Workmen Act 1825 was passed, which allowed trade unions but severely restricted their activity.

See also
UK labour law
Le Chapelier Law 1791, a similar law in  France
The Making of the English Working Class by E. P. Thompson

References

External links
Partial text of the Combination Act of 1800

Great Britain Acts of Parliament 1799
Legal history of the United Kingdom
History of labour law
United Kingdom labour law
Trade union legislation
British trade unions history